Brainerd is an unincorporated community in Butler County, Kansas, United States.  It is located on the north side of K-196 highway between the cities of Whitewater and Potwin.

History

Early history

For many millennia, the Great Plains of North America was inhabited by nomadic Native Americans.  From the 16th century to 18th century, the Kingdom of France claimed ownership of large parts of North America.  In 1762, after the French and Indian War, France secretly ceded New France to Spain, per the Treaty of Fontainebleau.

19th century
In 1802, Spain returned most of the land to France.  In 1803, most of the land for modern day Kansas was acquired by the United States from France as part of the 828,000 square mile Louisiana Purchase for 2.83 cents per acre.

In 1854, the Kansas Territory was organized, then in 1861 Kansas became the 34th U.S. state.  In 1855, Butler County was established within the Kansas Territory, which included the land for modern day Brainerd.

A post office was established in Holden on December 14, 1870, then renamed to Brainerd on January 25, 1886.  The post office closed on August 31, 1907.

Brainerd was platted in 1885 around a depot along the McPherson branch of the Missouri Pacific Railroad. The community was named for Elisha B. Brainerd, an original landowner.  It quickly grew, including some businesses and houses from nearby community of Plum Grove.

20th century
In 1961, Frederic Remington High School was built immediately north of Brainerd.  Leading up to this new school, Whitewater, Potwin, Brainerd, Elbing, Furley, Countryside, and Golden Gate schools merged to form a joint rural high school. Heated opposition between Whitewater and Potwin occurred during the discussion for the location of the new high school.  Rural voters pushed for a centralized location in neither town.  A public vote was passed to build the new school near Brainerd.

21st century
In 2006, the Remington Rock monument was built near the Frederic Remington High School.

Geography
Brainerd is located at  (37.9511267, -97.0953122), which is the north side of K-196 highway between the cities of Whitewater and Potwin.

Education
The community is served by Remington USD 206 public school district.  The Remington High School mascot is a Bronco.
 Frederic Remington High School north side of Brainerd.
 Remington Middle School in Whitewater.
 Remington Elementary School in Potwin.

Media

Print
 The Newton Kansan, regional newspaper from Newton.
 Butler County Times-Gazette, regional newspaper from El Dorado.
 The Wichita Eagle, major regional newspaper from Wichita.

Radio
Goessel is served by numerous radio stations of the Wichita-Hutchinson listening market area, and satellite radio.  See Media in Wichita, Kansas.

Television
Goessel is served by over-the-air ATSC digital TV of the Wichita-Hutchinson viewing market area, cable TV, and satellite TV.  See Media in Wichita, Kansas.

Infrastructure

Transportation
K-196 highway runs along the south side of the community.

References

Further reading

 Plum Grove, Brainerd, Whitewater, and Potwin from 1870 to 1900; Roland H. Ensz; Emporia State University; 134 pages; 1970.

External links
 Brainerd, Kansas - Time, Place and Memory on the Prairie Plains (A Brief History of the Brainerd Area)
 Frederic Remington Area Historical Society
 Butler County maps: Current, Historic, KDOT
 Topo Map of Whitewater / Potwin / Brainerd area, USGS

Unincorporated communities in Kansas
Unincorporated communities in Butler County, Kansas